Mount Alice is a high mountain summit in the northern Front Range of the Rocky Mountains of North America. Just who the namesake Alice was is unclear, but according to one source she was likely a "woman of ill repute".

Climbing
The standard routes to the summit can be climbed in a long day out of Wild Basin. Most climbers ascent via Hourglass Ridge above Lion lakes or else via Boulder Grand Pass above Thunder Lake. Both are class 3 routes and do not require any technical moves.

Historical names
Mount Alice – 1911 
Sioux Mountain

See also

List of Colorado mountain ranges
List of Colorado mountain summits
List of Colorado fourteeners
List of Colorado 4000 meter prominent summits
List of the most prominent summits of Colorado
List of Colorado county high points

References

External links

Satellite View
Map & Trip Report of Mount Alice

Alice
Mountains of Boulder County, Colorado
Mountains of Grand County, Colorado
Great Divide of North America
North American 4000 m summits